Victor Hugo (25 November 1877 – 8 April 1930) was a cricketer who played first-class cricket for South Australia from 1898 to 1900. He was related to the French writer of the same name.

Victor Hugo was born in Adelaide at the Bushman's Club, of which his father William was one of the founders. He was educated at Prince Alfred College and at the Adelaide Shorthand and Business Training Academy, where he excelled at bookkeeping.

A right-arm medium-pace bowler, his best figures for South Australia were 4 for 69 against Western Australia in 1898-99.

He worked for the South Australian Produce Department for 25 years until his death. He left a widow, a son (also called Victor) and a daughter.

References

External links

Victor Hugo at CricketArchive

1877 births
1930 deaths
People educated at Prince Alfred College
Australian cricketers
South Australia cricketers
Cricketers from Adelaide